Madness (Is All in the Mind) is a song by British band Madness from their fourth album The Rise & Fall. It spent 9 weeks in the UK charts, peaking at number eight in February 1983. It was released as a double A-side with "Tomorrow's (Just Another Day)", with the latter being the side which got most airplay. Unlike most Madness songs this features Chas Smash on lead vocals. It should not be confused with "Madness", the Prince Buster song previously covered by the group.

Charts

Notes

1983 singles
Madness (band) songs
Songs written by Chris Foreman
1982 songs
Stiff Records singles
Song recordings produced by Clive Langer
Song recordings produced by Alan Winstanley